Qaleh-ye Kuf or Qala-e Kuf    is a village and Capital  District  Kuf Ab  in Badakhshan Province in north-eastern Afghanistan.

See also
Badakhshan Province

References

External links
Satellite map at Maplandia.com

Populated places in Kuf Ab District
Villages in Afghanistan